Red White & Blue Beer was a brand of American beer, originally produced by the Pabst Brewing Company and later produced by  G. Heileman Brewery  of La Crosse, WI. Pre-Prohibition advertisements lauded its "mellow" taste and drinkability. Returning after Prohibition, the brand's name alone would have been a selling point, during the patriotic American sensibilities of World War II and after.

The brand experienced a resurgence in the early 1980s, during the country's economic recession. The Avalanche Bar & Grill, an iconic drinking establishment on the campus of Marquette University, reportedly sold more RWB per capita than any other tavern in America or abroad.  Patrons often purchased it (at .50/can) for no other reason than to pour it on the floor, providing a slicker surface for 'naked beer sliding', a late night tradition made famous at The 'Lanche.  A series of folksy, radio editorial-style commercials by Harmon R. Whittle poked fun at politicians of the day, suggesting that Red White & Blue Beer might be a less-expensive, more effective means of promoting America abroad, than foreign aid or other programs, as "an honest beer, at an honest price." In any case, sales of the brand climbed by sixty percent, after the advertisements began to air, and store displays began to carry Whittle's signature.

In latter days, the brand was notable for its low price (comparable to Hamm's Beer or Schaefer Beer) and thus its popularity among drinkers on a budget (including college students and low-income persons). Other drinkers spurned the brand, however, giving the beer low ratings and unfavorable comparisons.

Neither Pabst.com nor MillerBrewing.com (Miller has taken over most of Pabst's brewing operations) include the brand on their current rosters, and Red White & Blue Beer is presumed to be out of production. However, a September 16, 2010, article in Business Week ("Keeping Pabst Blue Ribbon Cool") mentioned that the young owners of Pabst are also planning on reviving other "dead" brands they have the rights to, including Red White & Blue Beer. The article features owners Evan and Daren Metropoulos planning their revival of the brand via a patriotic appeal that directly contributes to military charities.

External links 
 Text of Red, White and Blue Beer radio commercial

American beer brands
Pabst Brewing Company